HMCS Margaret Brooke (AOPV 431) is the second  for the Royal Canadian Navy (RCN). The class was derived from the Arctic Offshore Patrol Ship project as part of the National Shipbuilding Procurement Strategy and is primarily designed for the patrol and support of Canada's Arctic regions. Named after Sub-Lieutenant Margaret Brooke, an RCN nursing sister who tried to save another person during the sinking of the ferry  during World War II. Margaret Brooke was ordered in 2011, laid down in 2016 and launched in 2019. The vessel began contractor sea trials in May 2021, and it was delivered to the Royal Canadian Navy for post-acceptance sea trials on 15 July 2021. The official naming ceremony for the ship was conducted on 29 May 2022 in conjunction with that for sister ship . The vessel was commissioned on 28 October 2022.

Design and description
The s are designed for use in the Arctic regions of Canada for patrol and support within Canada's exclusive economic zone. The ship has an enclosed foredeck that protects machinery and work spaces from Arctic climates. The vessel is powered by a diesel-electric system composed of four  MAN 6L32/44CR four-stroke medium-speed diesel generators and two electric propulsion motors rated at  driving two shafts. The ship is also equipped with a bow thruster to aid during manoeuvres and docking procedures without requiring tugboat assistance. Margaret Brooke is equipped with fin stabilizers to decrease roll in open water but can be retracted during icebreaking.

Margaret Brooke is able to deploy with multiple payloads, including shipping containers, underwater survey equipment or landing craft. Payload operations are aided by a  crane for loading and unloading. The ship is equipped with a vehicle bay which can hold can pickup trucks, all-terrain vehicles and snowmobiles. The ship is armed with one BAE Mk 38  gun and two M2 Browning machine guns. The patrol ship has an onboard hangar and flight deck for helicopters up to the size of a Sikorsky CH-148 Cyclone. Margaret Brooke has a complement of 65 and accommodation for 85 or 87.

Service history
The order for the Arctic Offshore Patrol Ships was placed on 19 October 2011 with Irving Shipyards of Halifax, Nova Scotia, as part of the National Shipbuilding Procurement Strategy. The ship was constructed in 62 blocks, which were then pieced together into three larger blocks. These three "mega blocks" were fitted together to form the hull of the ship. On 13 April 2015 the government announced a second ship would be named Margaret Brooke. During World War II, Margaret Brooke, a navy nursing sister, was decorated for her actions during the sinking of the passenger ferry . The vessel's keel was laid down on 29 May 2017 and the vessel was launched on 10 November 2019.  The ship began contractor sea trials in May 2021. The vessel was delivered to the Royal Canadian Navy for post-acceptance sea trials on 15 July 2021. The naming ceremony was held on 29 May 2022 in conjunction with that for sister ship .

The vessel, though not formally commissioned, was among the RCN ships deployed to the Arctic as part of the multinational military exercise Operation Nanook in August 2022. In September 2022, Margaret Brooke was tasked for hurricane relief efforts, after Hurricane Fiona's devastating impact to the Maritimes. The vessel provided assistance including damage assessment and welfare checks to the most impacted communities along the south coast of Newfoundland, where water access was the only means of entering the area. The vessel was commissioned on 28 October 2022.

References

Harry DeWolf-class offshore patrol vessels
2019 ships
Ships built in Nova Scotia